Dyachkov is a Russian masculine surname, its feminine counterpart is Dyachkova. It may refer to
Maria Dyatchkova (born 1982), Russian football player
Sergey Dyachkov (born 1982), Azerbaijani swimmer
Yevgeni Dyachkov (born 1975), Russian football player
Yuri Dyachkov (born 1940), Soviet Olympic decathlete

Russian-language surnames